Live in London is a live album from Deep Purple. It was recorded on 22 May 1974 at Gaumont State Theatre in Kilburn, London by the BBC for radio broadcast, but was unreleased on vinyl until 1982. It features the Mk 3 lineup of Blackmore/Coverdale/Hughes/
Lord/Paice during the tour for their album Burn.

At one point during the album, keyboardist Jon Lord jokingly refers to himself as "Rick Emerson" while introducing the band. This is a combination of the first and last name of the keyboardists for progressive rock bands Yes and Emerson, Lake, and Palmer, which are Rick Wakeman and Keith Emerson, respectively.

Track listing
All songs written by Ritchie Blackmore, David Coverdale, Glenn Hughes*, Jon Lord and Ian Paice, except where indicated. (*) Glenn Hughes is credited on the 2007 release.

Original release on vinyl

The 2003 CD Reissue
The reissued CD edition was released by Purple Records on 30 December 2003 in Japan. This 2 CD reissue included the whole show, with the addition of previously unreleased 30-minute "Space Truckin'"

The 2007 2CD Remaster
The remastered CD edition with the whole show was released by EMI on 3 September 2007 in Europe and some other markets. There is no word yet on an American release.

Personnel
Deep Purple
 Ritchie Blackmore – guitar
 David Coverdale – lead vocals
 Glenn Hughes – bass, vocals
 Jon Lord – keyboards
 Ian Paice – drums

Additional personnel
 Martin Birch – Engineer
 Peter Mew – Original album remastering

Charts

References

External links
Everything2: Deep Purple Live in London (Review)

1982 live albums
Deep Purple live albums
Harvest Records live albums